Louis Adams Frothingham (July 13, 1871 – August 23, 1928) was a United States representative from Massachusetts.

Early life
Frothingham was born in Jamaica Plain on July 13, 1871. He attended the public schools and Adams Academy. He graduated from Harvard University in 1893 (where he was a member of the Porcellian) and from Harvard Law School in 1896.  He was admitted to the bar and commenced practice in Boston.  He served as second lieutenant in the United States Marine Corps in the Spanish–American War.

Political career
Frothingham was elected a member of the Massachusetts House of Representatives, and served as Speaker from 1904 to 1905. He was the Republican nominee in the 1905 Boston mayoral election after narrowly defeating former Judge Henry S. Dewey. He lost the general election to Democrat John F. Fitzgerald 48% to 39%. He served as the 41st Lieutenant Governor 1909–1911, but was an unsuccessful candidate for Governor in 1911. He was lecturer at Harvard. He then moved to North Easton and continued the practice of law. He was a delegate to the Republican National Convention in 1916.

On May 9, 1916, Frothingham married Mary Shreve Ames in North Easton, Massachusetts. Mary Shreve Ames was a member of the wealthy and prominent Ames family of Easton, Massachusetts, she was the daughter of Frederick Lothrop Ames the great niece of Congressman Oakes Ames, and the first cousin, once removed of Oliver Ames who was Lieutenant Governor and Governor of Massachusetts.

Frothingham served as a major in the United States Army during World War I. He was a member of the commission to visit the soldiers and sailors from Massachusetts in France. He served as first vice commander of the Massachusetts branch of the American Legion in 1919. He was overseer of Harvard University for eighteen years.

Frothingham was elected as a Republican to the Sixty-seventh and to the three succeeding Congresses and served from March 4, 1921, until his death on board the yacht Winsome in North Haven, Maine on August 23, 1928. His interment was in Village Cemetery in North Easton.

See also
Speakers of the Massachusetts House of Representatives
List of United States Congress members who died in office (1900–49)
 125th Massachusetts General Court (1904)
 126th Massachusetts General Court (1905)

References

Bibliography
Who's Who in State Politics, 1911 Practical Politics (1911) pp. 6–7.
 Sherburne, John H. Battery A: Field Artillery M. V. M., 1895–1905, (1908) pp. 14, 18, 184–185.
 Bridgman, Arthur Milnor. A Souvenir of Massachusetts Legislators (1901) p. 179.

Footnotes

External links
 
 Frothingham election records at ourcampaigns.com

1871 births
1928 deaths
Republican Party members of the Massachusetts House of Representatives
Speakers of the Massachusetts House of Representatives
Harvard Law School alumni
Republican Party members of the United States House of Representatives from Massachusetts
People from Jamaica Plain